Robert Geudert was an American soccer goalkeeper who played in the National Association Football League, the first American Soccer League and the Eastern Professional Soccer League.

Geudert’s early career is unknown, but by 1921, he was playing for New York F.C. in the National Association Football League.  In 1922, New York became an inaugural member of the American Soccer League and Geurdert established himself as a regular, first-team goalkeeper.  In 1924, Guerdert move to the New York Giants where he played for three seasons.  During the 1925-1926 season, he went on loan to the Brooklyn Wanderers for one game.  In August 1927, Bethlehem Steel F.C. signed Geudert as backup to Dave Edwards.  After Edwards was injured in October, Geudert saw time in thirteen games.  In the fall of 1928, Geudert moved to Celtic where he finished his professional career.

Career stats

External links
 Bethlehem Steel bio

References

1900 births
1984 deaths
American soccer players
American Soccer League (1921–1933) players
Bethlehem Steel F.C. (1907–1930) players
Brooklyn Wanderers players
Eastern Professional Soccer League (1928–29) players
National Association Football League players
New York Field Club players
Association football goalkeepers